Ramzoo is a village in the Nicobar district of Andaman and Nicobar Islands, India. It is located in the Nancowry tehsil.

Demographics 
The village was severely affected by the 2004 Indian Ocean earthquake and tsunami. According to the 2011 census of India, Ramzoo had 23 households. The effective literacy rate (i.e. the literacy rate of population excluding children aged 6 and below) was 77.5%.

References 

Villages in Nancowry tehsil